Paria scutellaris is a species of leaf beetle. It is found in North America.

References

Further reading

 

Eumolpinae
Articles created by Qbugbot
Beetles described in 1920
Beetles of North America